William H. Porter was professor of surgery in the school of the Royal College of Surgeons of Ireland from 1836. He was noted for his writing on the larynx and the trachea.

Selected publications 
 "A Successful Case of Cynanache Maligna, with Trachaeotomy", Medico-Chirurgical Transactions, 1821.
 Larynx and Trachea. 1826.
 "Cases of Ligature of Subclavian and Right Carotid, and a Case of Tracheotomy", Dublin Hospital Reports, 1830.

References 

Irish surgeons
19th-century Irish medical doctors
Year of birth missing
Year of death missing